Ernst Fraenkel (26 December 1898 – 28 March 1975) was a German-Jewish lawyer and political scientist. Prior to World War II, Fraenkel served as a criminal defense lawyer for Jews who were targeted by the Nazi regime. After the war, he authored the book The Dual State on the political structure of the Nazi regime and subsequently became one of the founding fathers of German political science.

During the Weimar Republic Fraenkel was a member of the social democrats and one of the few jurists who held socialist opinions. According to some historians in the 1930s he was designated to be Attorney General of a possible social-democratic German government. In 1939 he immigrated to the United States where he began to develop his respect for the politics of that country, especially its pluralism and its checks and balances.

Life
Fraenkel was born in a Jewish family in Cologne. He served during the First World War from 1916 to 1918 in the German Army. He wrote his dissertation in law about The void labour contract (Der nichtige Arbeitsvertrag), under Hugo Sinzheimer.

During the Weimar Republic he worked as a lawyer for labor law with Franz Leopold Neumann, published scientific publications and was engaged in socialist politics. Having been a soldier in World War I, he was still allowed to work to a limited extent even after the Nazis came to power in 1933. He was connected to several resistance groups such as the Internationaler Sozialistischer Kampfbund (International Socialist Fighting Alliance). In 1938 he finally immigrated to the United Kingdom, in 1939 to the United States.

Shortly after arriving in New York Fraenkel moved to Chicago, where he studied American law at the University of Chicago Law School, graduating in 1941. During this period he revised and completed a manuscript that he had brought with him from Germany. In this work, published in 1941 as The Dual State, he analyses the political system of the Nazi state. For Fraenkel there coexisted in the Nazi government a "normative state" (Normenstaat), which secured the continuation of capitalist society for those Germans not threatened by Nazism, and a "prerogative state" (Maßnahmenstaat), which used legal sanctions as well as brutal violence against people considered to be enemies of Nazism and Nazi Germany.

Fraenkel lectured at the New School for Social Research.

From 1945 on Fraenkel was an adviser to the American government but was soon dissatisfied with their policy of occupation in Korea. For the United Nations he was supposed to be one of the people to prepare free elections in Korea, but the Korean War made the elections impossible and forced Fraenkel to leave the country. 

In 1951 Fraenkel returned to Germany. He became a lecturer at the Deutsche Hochschule für Politik in Berlin and later a professor at the Freie Universität Berlin, where he founded the John F. Kennedy-Institute for North American Studies. He considered his writings to be normative, his concept of pluralism was meant to criticize the existing political system. Those among his students who were active in the 1968 movement, however, saw his American-influenced theories as defending monopolistic capitalism. He died in Berlin.

Works
 1927 – Zur Soziologie der Klassenjustiz (Sociology of Class Justice)
 1931–1933 – "Chronik" des republikanischen Richterbundes (Chronicles of the Republikanischer Richterbund)
 1941 – The Dual State
 1960 – Das amerikanische Regierungssystem (The American System of Government)
 1964 – Deutschland und die westlichen Demokratien (Germany and the Western Democracies)

See Also 

 Dual State (model)

References

1898 births
1975 deaths
Jurists from Cologne
American political scientists
German political scientists
Jewish emigrants from Nazi Germany to the United States
People from the Rhine Province
People educated at the Musterschule
Commanders Crosses of the Order of Merit of the Federal Republic of Germany
Academic staff of the Free University of Berlin
20th-century political scientists